Mamadou Diatta (born 5 April 2001) is a Senegalese professional footballer who plays as a midfielder.

Career
On 6 August 2020, Diatta signed his first professional contract with Pau FC. He made his professional debut with Pau in 1–1 Ligue 2 tie with Rodez AF on 29 August 2020.

References

External links
 

2001 births
Living people
People from Ziguinchor
Senegalese footballers
Association football midfielders
Pau FC players
Ligue 2 players
Senegalese expatriate footballers
Senegalese expatriates in France
Expatriate footballers in France